General elections were held in Western Samoa on 5 November 1941.

Electoral system
Two Europeans were elected from a single two-seat constituency. Voting was restricted to European and mixed European-Samoans aged 21 or over. A total of 578 people registered to vote, including around a hundred German nationals, whose right to vote in the election was confirmed by the New Zealand government.

Campaign
It was reported in October 1941 that the two incumbent members Charles Dawson and Olaf Frederick Nelson would not stand; Nelson due to ill-health and Dawson having left the Samoa. However, Nelson did eventually contest the elections, alongside former MLCs Alfred Smyth and Arthur Williams, the shop manager Percy Glover and Amando Stowers, a planter and leader of the Labour Party.

Results

References

Western Samoa
General
Elections in Samoa